The 2006 European Short Track Speed Skating Championships took place between 20 and 22 January 2006 in Krynica-Zdrój, Poland.

Medal summary

Medal table

Men's events

Women's events

Participating nations

See also
Short track speed skating
European Short Track Speed Skating Championships

External links
Detailed results
Results overview

European Short Track Speed Skating Championships
European Short Track Speed Skating Championships
European
International speed skating competitions hosted by Poland
Sport in Lesser Poland Voivodeship
European Short Track Speed Skating Championships